Pessograptis cyanactis is a moth in the family Gelechiidae. It was described by Edward Meyrick in 1930. It is found in Pará, Brazil.

References

Chelariini
Taxa named by Edward Meyrick
Moths described in 1930